is a Japanese freestyle skier who competes internationally.

He became junior world champion in 2017, and participated in the 2018 Winter Olympics.

References

External links

2001 births
Living people
Japanese male freestyle skiers
Olympic freestyle skiers of Japan
Freestyle skiers at the 2018 Winter Olympics